The Los Angeles Alligator Farm, located next door to the Los Angeles Ostrich Farm in the Lincoln Heights neighborhood of Los Angeles, California, United States, was an alligator farm and a major city tourist attraction from 1907 until 1953.

Originally situated across from Lincoln Park, at 3627 Mission Road, it moved to Buena Park, California in 1953, where it was renamed the California Alligator Farm. 

The Buena Park location was a “two-acre, junglelike park” across from Knott’s Berry Farm. Circa 1974, it housed “more than a hundred species representing all five orders of reptiles, with an emphasis on crocodilians.” Alligator and snake shows were held daily in summer and weekly in the off-season.

The attraction was shut down in 1984 after attendance dropped below 50,000 people annually, and the animals were relocated to a private estate in Florida.

See also
Cawston Ostrich Farm

References

External links
LincolnHeightsLA.com: Los Angeles Alligator Farm 1907-1953
Laist.com: Los Angeles Alligator Farm

Zoos in California
Lincoln Heights, Los Angeles
Defunct amusement parks in California
History of Los Angeles
Tourist attractions in Los Angeles
1907 establishments in California
1984 disestablishments in California
Amusement parks closed in 1984
Amusement parks opened in 1907